Love Forbidden is a 2002 French drama film directed by , starring Rodolphe Marconi, Andrea Necci, Echo Danon, Orietta Gianjorio and .

Cast
 Rodolphe Marconi as Bruce
 Andrea Necci as Matteo
 Echo Danon as Aston
 Orietta Gianjorio as Orietta
  as Germain
 Maria Teresa De Belis as Maria Teresa
 Irene D'Agostino as Irene
 Tomaso D'Ulizia as Tomaso

Reception
Dave Kehr of The New York Times wrote that while the film "falls back on a screenwriting convention for its unfortunately abrupt ending", it "suggests" that Marconi "possesses a talent and a sensibility likely to flower in the future." Frank Schenk of The Hollywood Reporter wrote that while the film's exploration of the shifting nature of sexuality is "sometimes provocative", it is "ultimately undone by its pretensions". Maitland McDonagh of TV Guide rated the film 2 stars out of 5 and wrote that the film is "sometimes fascinating, other times just infuriating."

Scott Foundas of Variety called the film a "step backward" for Marconi. The film received negative reviews in Film Journal International, The Village Voice and Video Store Magazine.

References

External links
 
 

French drama films
2002 drama films